Gary Eugene Young (born 1951) is an American poet, printer and book artist. In 2010, he was named the first ever Poet Laureate of Santa Cruz County.

Life
He graduated from University of California Santa Cruz and University of California, Irvine, with an M.F.A.

His work has appeared in Poetry, Antaeus, The American Poetry Review, The Kenyon Review, Montserrat Review, ZYZZYVA..

In 1975, he founded Greenhouse Review Press. His print work is represented in numerous collections, including the Museum of Modern Art, the Victoria and Albert Museum, and The Getty Center for the Arts.

His archive is held at Brown University.

He teaches at the University of California Santa Cruz, and has lived near Santa Cruz for thirty years, with his wife and two sons.

In 2012, Young and fellow poet Christopher Buckley published One for the Money: The Sentence as a Poetic Form, A Poetry Workshop Handbook and Anthology through Lynx House Press.

Awards
 2009 Shelley Memorial Award
 National Endowment for the Humanities
 the Vogelstein Foundation
 the California Arts Council
 two fellowship grants from the National Endowment for the Arts
 Pushcart Prize
 James D. Phelan Award for The Dream of a Moral Life William Carlos Williams Award of the Poetry Society of America, No Other Life Peregrine Smith Poetry Prize, Braver Deeds first poet laureate, City of [Santa Cruz], CA
2013 Lucille Medwick Memorial Award of the Poetry Society of America
2017 Lexi Rudnitsky Editor’s Choice Award for That's What I ThoughtWorks

Poetry
 
 
 
 
 
 
 New and Selected Poems'', White Pine Press.

Editor

References

External links
 "Author's website"
 "An Interview with Gary Young", Poetry Santa Cruz
  

1951 births
Living people
Poets from California
University of California, Santa Cruz faculty
University of California, Santa Cruz alumni
University of California, Irvine alumni